Princess Fawzia may refer to:

Princess Fawzia Fuad of Egypt (1921–2013), daughter of King Fuad I of Egypt, and first wife of Mohammad Reza Pahlavi, Shah of Iran
Princess Fawzia Farouk of Egypt (1940–2005), daughter of King Farouk of Egypt
 Princess Fawzia-Latifa of Egypt (born 12 February 1982), daughter of King Fuad II of Egypt